= Grafton Village, Virginia =

Unincorporated community in Virginia, US

Coordinates: 38°19′24″N 77°26′31″W

Grafton Village is an unincorporated community in Stafford County, in the U.S. state of Virginia.
